Khader Ghetrich Baqlah (born 15 September 1998) is a Jordanian swimmer. He competed in the men's 200 metre freestyle event at the 2016 Summer Olympics, where he ranked 31st with a time of 1:48.42. He did not advance to the semifinals. In 2014, he represented Jordan at the 2014 Summer Youth Olympics held in Nanjing, China.

He swam for the University of Florida. He was an eleven-time All American

References

External links
 

1998 births
Living people
Olympic swimmers of Jordan
Swimmers at the 2016 Summer Olympics
Swimmers at the 2014 Summer Youth Olympics
Swimmers at the 2018 Asian Games
Asian Games competitors for Jordan
Jordanian male freestyle swimmers